Sean Barrett (born 1959) is a writer, nucleonicist, former member of the Wikipedia Arbitration Committee, and the grandson of Linton Lomas Barrett.  He is the author of GURPS Lensman: Starkly Astounding Space-Opera Adventure, a book of role-playing instructions carefully based upon the Lensman series by E.E. Smith, and authorized by Dr. Smith's literary executor, Verna Smith Trestrail.  He was a nucleonicist on the USS Ohio (SSBN-726), and senior health physicist on the Three Mile Island Unit Two Recovery Team.

Bibliography

  Contains a self-deprecating autobiographical sketch on p. 4, which is included in the excerpt at Steve Jackson Games.
 Out-Takes from GURPS Lensman

References

External links

American science fiction writers
Living people
1959 births
American male novelists
Health physicists
20th-century American novelists
20th-century American male writers